Fergus Tuohy (born 1968 in Clarecastle, County Clare) is a former Irish sportsperson.  He played hurling with his local club Clarecastle and was a member of the Clare senior inter-county team in the 1980s and 1990s. Tuohy won two All-Ireland titles with Clare in 1995 and 1997 and three Munster titles.

References

1968 births
Living people
Clarecastle hurlers
Clare inter-county hurlers
Munster inter-provincial hurlers
All-Ireland Senior Hurling Championship winners